The 1959 Icelandic Basketball Tournament was the 8th season of the top tier men's basketball in Iceland. It was organized by Körfuknattleiksráð Reykjavíkur and started on 15 March 1959 and ended on 17 April 1959. ÍS won its first title by posting the best record in the league.

Competition format
The participating teams played each other once for a total of 3 games and the top placed team won the national championship. If two teams where tied at the season's end in first place, an extra game would be played for the championship. The 1959 tournament used was the first one to use the new rulebook, translated by Bogi Þorsteinsson and Benedikt Jakobsson.

Results

Notes

Table

References

External links
Official Icelandic Basketball Federation website

Lea
Úrvalsdeild karla (basketball)